Emmalocera tricoloralis is a species of snout moth in the genus Emmalocera. It was described by George Hampson in 1903. It is found in India.

References

Moths described in 1903
Emmalocera